St Mary's Church is a Church of England Parish Church in Sturminster Newton, Dorset. The present church dates from a rebuild in 1486 by the abbots of Glastonbury. The church was heavily modified in the 19th century, but the carved wagon roof remains.

The church is designated as Grade I by Historic England

The church is notable for having stained glass windows by Mary Lowndes and Harry Clarke.

References

External links
 Official Website

Grade I listed churches in Dorset
Church of England church buildings in Dorset
Churches in Dorset
Sturminster Newton